Thomas Stevenson (1818–1887) was a Scottish civil engineer and lighthouse designer

Thomas or Tom Stevenson may also refer to:
Thomas Stevenson (toxicologist) (1838–1908), English chemist
Thomas Stevenson (cricketer) (1804–1845), English cricketer
Thomas G. Stevenson (1836–1864), general in the Union Army during the American Civil War
Thomas L. Stevenson, Pennsylvania politician
Tom Stevenson (born 1951), British wine writer

See also
Thomas Stephenson (disambiguation)